"Do You Know You Are My Sunshine" is a song written by Don Reid and Harold Reid, and recorded by American country music group The Statler Brothers.  It was released in March 1978 as the first single from the album Entertainers...On and Off the Record.  The song was The Statler Brothers' twenty-seventh country hit and the first of four number ones on the country chart, as well as the group's only number one with original tenor Lew DeWitt.  The single stayed at number one for two weeks and spent a total of eleven weeks on the country chart.

Chart performance

References

The Statler Brothers songs
1978 singles
Song recordings produced by Jerry Kennedy
Songs written by Don Reid (singer)
Songs written by Harold Reid
Mercury Records singles
1978 songs